The 2016 Scottish Cup Final was the 131st final of the Scottish Cup and the final of the 2015–16 Scottish Cup, the most prestigious knockout football competition in Scotland. The match took place at Hampden Park on 21 May 2016 and was contested by Scottish Championship teams Rangers and Hibernian. It was the first final to be contested by two teams from outside the top tier of the Scottish football league system. Hibernian ended a run of 114 years from last winning the competition, beating Rangers 3–2 with a stoppage time goal from club captain David Gray.

The winners, Hibernian, entered the second qualifying round of the 2016–17 UEFA Europa League.

Route to the final

Hibernian
Hibernian started the Scottish Cup in the fourth round as one of the top four placed teams in the 2014–15 Scottish Championship. They were drawn away at fellow Championship team Raith Rovers. At Stark's Park, Hibernian won 2–0 with goals from Darren McGregor and Dominique Malonga. In the fifth round, they were drawn away against their Edinburgh derby rivals and Premiership club, Heart of Midlothian. Following a 2–2 draw at Tynecastle Stadium, Hibernian won the replay at their Easter Road 1–0 via a Jason Cummings goal. In the quarter finals they were drawn at home against the Scottish Cup holders, Premiership side Inverness Caledonian Thistle. Following a 1–1 draw, Hibernian won the replay at Caledonian Stadium 2–1 due to two goals from Anthony Stokes. In the semi-final at neutral Hampden Park, they were drawn against Premiership Dundee United and progressed to the final after winning 4–2 in a penalty shoot out.

Rangers
Rangers also started the Scottish Cup in the fourth round as one of the top four placed teams in the previous years Scottish Championship. In the fourth round they were drawn against Scottish League One team Cowdenbeath at home. At their Ibrox Stadium, Rangers won 5–1 with goals from Lee Wallace, Barrie McKay and a hat-trick from Martyn Waghorn. In the next round they were drawn with Premiership team Kilmarnock. After a 0–0 draw at Ibrox Stadium, Rangers won 2–1 in the replay at Rugby Park with goals from Waghorn and Nicky Clark. In the quarter finals, Rangers were drawn at home against Premiership Dundee, which they won 4–0 with goals from Harry Forrester, Jason Holt, Andy Halliday and Wallace. In the semi-finals, Rangers were drawn against their Old Firm rivals Celtic in only their second derby since 2015.  Rangers progressed to the final winning 5–4 on penalties. Rangers entered the final as Scottish Championship league champions and Scottish Challenge Cup winners.

Pre-match
This was Hibernian's 1st victory in the Scottish Cup Final in 114 years, having previously won two Scottish Cups (in 1887 and 1902) and lost in ten finals since their last victory. The 2016 final marked their third appearance in the final in the space of five years, having lost to Hearts in 2012 and Celtic in 2013. Rangers appeared in the Scottish Cup final after winning the competition 33 times under their previous guise. The most recent appearance and victory for the former club was in 2009, when they defeated Falkirk 1–0. This was the first meeting of the clubs in the Scottish Cup since 2008, when Rangers won 1–0 at Ibrox in a replay after a goalless draw at Easter Road. Hibernian and Rangers had previously met in one Scottish Cup Final, in 1979. Rangers won the cup that year by winning a second replay by 3–2, after the first two matches both finished goalless.

Match

Details

Match rules
 90 minutes
 30 minutes of extra time if necessary
 Penalty shoot-out if scores still level
 Seven named substitutes
 Maximum of three substitutions

Post-match
At the end of the match, thousands of Hibernian fans spilled out onto the pitch in celebration. An element headed to the other end of the ground to goad Rangers fans, who responded by entering the pitch themselves, leading to fights. Some Rangers players and staff were assaulted by the Hibernian fans as they tried to leave the pitch. The Rangers team received their runners-up medals in the dressing room. The SFA conducted a full investigation into the crowd trouble. The report was published in August and found that neither club was to blame but that the invasion was caused by the Hibs supporters' exuberance at winning the cup. It was pointed out that Rangers supporters had let off fireworks and sung sectarian songs during the match. The report suggested the possibility of making pitch invasions illegal as they are in England. The aftermath of the final is also notable for the five-minute rendition by Hibs' fans, having returned to the stands, of the club's anthem, the Proclaimers' "Sunshine on Leith".

References 

Scottish Cup Finals
Scottish Cup Final 2016
Scottish Cup Final 2016
Scottish Cup Final
Sports competitions in Glasgow
Scottish Cup Final
2010s in Glasgow
Scottish Cup 2016